Stuart Lane "Stu" Griffing (born November 9, 1926) is an American rower who competed in the 1948 Summer Olympics. He was born in New Haven, Connecticut. In 1948 he was a crew member of the American boat which won the bronze medal in the coxless fours event.

References

External links
 
 
 

1926 births
Living people
Rowers at the 1948 Summer Olympics
Olympic bronze medalists for the United States in rowing
American military personnel of World War II
American male rowers
Medalists at the 1948 Summer Olympics